Lower Parker School, also known as District #73 School, is a historic one-room school and  national historic district located near Salem, Dent County, Missouri. It was built in 1905 or 1906, and is a one-story, gable-front rectangular frame building measuring approximately 500 square feet. Also located in the district are the remains of two privies.

It was added to the National Register of Historic Places on May 31, 1991.

References

One-room schoolhouses in Missouri
Historic districts on the National Register of Historic Places in Missouri
School buildings on the National Register of Historic Places in Missouri
School buildings completed in 1906
Schools in Dent County, Missouri
Buildings and structures in Dent County, Missouri
National Register of Historic Places in Dent County, Missouri
1906 establishments in Missouri